A capriccio  (Italian: "following one's fancy") is a tempo marking indicating a free and capricious approach to the tempo (and possibly the style) of the piece. This marking will usually modify another, such as lento a capriccio, often used in the Hungarian Rhapsodies of Franz Liszt. Perhaps the most famous piece to use the term is Ludwig van Beethoven's Rondò a capriccio (Op. 129), better known as Rage Over a Lost Penny.

See also
Capriccio (music)

External links

References

"Capriccio, a", Grove Music Online ed. L. Macy (Accessed 28 April 2006)

Music performance
Musical notation
Rhythm and meter